Alejandro Adrián Correa Rodríguez (born 26 October 1979 in Montevideo) is a former Uruguayan footballer. He last played for Brazilian side São Luiz.

After his career at Italy, he played for Peñarol and scored in Copa Libertadores 2005.

He played for Cerrito since Clausura 2007. He also played for Tacuarembó in Apertura 2006.

He capped for Uruguay U20 team at 1999 FIFA World Youth Championship.

External links
 Profile at tenfieldigital

1979 births
Living people
Uruguayan footballers
Uruguay under-20 international footballers
Uruguayan expatriate footballers
Brescia Calcio players
Peñarol players
Rocha F.C. players
Central Español players
Tacuarembó F.C. players
A.S.D. Martina Calcio 1947 players
Serie A players
Expatriate footballers in Italy
Expatriate footballers in Brazil
Association football midfielders
Esporte Clube São Luiz players